The 1983 Copa del Rey was the 47th edition of the Spanish basketball Cup. It was the last edition organized by the Spanish Basketball Federation and its final was played in Palencia.

The competition was played after the end of the 1982–83 Liga Nacional.

Round of 16
Teams #2 played the second leg at home. Real Madrid and FC Barcelona received a bye to the quarterfinals.

|}

Quarterfinals

|}

Semifinals

|}

Final
FC Barcelona won its 13th title after beating Real Madrid 2-1 in the final CB Inmobanco. Previously, Real Madrid boycotted the semifinal against Barcelona due to the non-signature of the creation of the ACB by the Catalans.

As Barcelona won the Liga Nacional, Inmobanco qualified to the Cup Winners' Cup as runner-up, but finally was dissolved before the start of the next season.

References

External links
Boxscores at ACB.com 
Linguasport

Copa del Rey de Baloncesto
1982–83 in Spanish basketball